Malayan Banking Berhad (doing business as Maybank) is a Malaysian universal bank, with key operating "home markets" of Malaysia, Singapore, and Indonesia.  According to the 2020 Brand Finance report, Maybank is Malaysia's most valuable bank brand, the fourth top brand in amongst the Asean countries, and ranked 70th in the world’s most valuable bank brands.

Background
Maybank is Malaysia's largest bank by market capitalisation and total assets and one of the largest banks in Southeast Asia, with total assets exceeding US$203 billion and having a net profit of US$1.98 billion for 2019.

Maybank is also ranked 106th in The Banker's 2020 Top 1000 World Banks (as at July 2020) and is ranked 349th in the Forbes Global 2000 Leading Companies (as at May 2020).

Maybank is the largest public listed company on Bursa Malaysia, the Malaysian stock exchange, with a market capitalisation of US$23.7 billion as of 31 December 2019.

Maybank's Islamic banking arm, Maybank Islamic, is the largest Islamic bank in ASEAN and Malaysia in terms of assets, and was named 2020’s Global Islamic Bank of the Year by The Banker.

Maybank's network spans across all 10 ASEAN nations as well as key Asian countries and global financial centres with a network of 2,600 retail banking branches worldwide with more than 43,000 employees.

History
Maybank was founded by Singaporean business tycoon Tan Sri Khoo Teck Puat (who died in 2004) & Oei Tjong Ie. The company was led by President and CEO Tan Sri Amirsham Abdul Aziz from 1994 until March 2008 after which he was appointed Minister in the Prime Minister's Department in-charge of the Economic Planning Unit, a post he held until April 2009. Tan Sri Abdul Wahid Omar was President & CEO of Maybank Group from May 2008 to June 2013. On 1 May 2022, Dato' Khairussaleh Ramli was appointed as President & CEO of Maybank Group.

Timeline

 1960 – Maybank is incorporated on 31 May and begins operations in Kuala Lumpur on 12 September. Malayan Finance Corporation (later Maybank Finance) is established, the first wholly bank-owned finance company. Maybank’s first overseas branch opens in Brunei on 28 November. Branches are also opened in Singapore.
 1962 – Listed on the Kuala Lumpur Stock Exchange. Hong Kong and London branches opened.
 1973 – Forms own investment banking arm, Aseambankers Malaysia Berhad (Asian & Euro-American Merchant Banking (Malaysia) Berhad)
 1977 – Mayban-Phoenix Assurance Bhd is incorporated offering underwriting general insurance risks.  Mayban-Phoenix Assurance was renamed Mayban Assurance in 1986
 1984 – New York branch opened
 1990 – Set up new operations in the Federal Territory of Labuan
 1992 – Mayban Securities formed.
 1993 – Maybank Ventures begins operations in February. In September, Aseam Leasing and Credit Bhd are incorporated, offering leasing and hire purchase activities. Opens representative office in Beijing, People’s Republic of China
 1994 – Entered a joint-venture with PT Bank Nusa Nasional (Indonesia), bringing the Maybank name to the Indonesian market. A branch is opened in Phnom Penh, Cambodia
 1995 – Maybank (PNG) Ltd. opens in Port Moresby and Lae
 1996 – Hanoi branch and a representative office in Ho Chi Minh City are officially opened. Maybank Bankassurans launched, offering insurance products to customers at bank branches. Kwong Yik Bank sold to Rashid Hussain Berhad in December
 1997 – Acquired a 60% stake in PNB-Republic Bank of the Philippines and renamed it Maybank Philippines Inc
 2000 – First Malaysia bank to open a branch in Shanghai, People’s Republic of China. Acquired Pacific Bank and the Phileo Allied Bank Bhd, and then merged in 2001
 2001 – Maybank and Fortis International NV collaborate to set up Mayban Fortis Holdings Bhd in a 70:30 partnership. All Maybank’s insurance companies are grouped under Mayban Fortis Holdings Bhd
 2002 – Mayban Takaful Bhd commences operations, the first Takaful company owned by a conventional bank in Malaysia. First Malaysia bank to operate in Bahrain
 2005 – Acquired Malaysia National Insurance Bhd (MNI) and its subsidiary, Takaful Nasional Sdn Bhd (Takaful Nasional)
 2006 – Maybank acquired American Express' card business in Malaysia
 2007 – Launched Etiqa, the new brand name for Maybank’s conventional and takaful businesses under Mayban Fortis Holdings Bhd
 2008 – Islamic banking subsidiary, Maybank Islamic Berhad, established. Acquires stakes in An Binh Bank (Vietnam), MCB Bank Ltd of Pakistan and Bank Internasional Indonesia
 2009 – Renamed Aseambankers to Maybank Investment Bank. Completed a RM6 billion rights issue – the largest in Malaysian corporate history
 2010 – Introduced a Dividend Reinvestment Plan, the first public listed company in Malaysia to do so
 2011 – Acquired Kim Eng Holdings Limited, making it its subsidiary 
 2012 - First branch in Laos opened, completing the Group’s footprint in all 10 ASEAN nations
 2015 - Exited Papua New Guinea with the sale of Maybank (PNG) Limited and Mayban Property (PNG) Limited to Kina Ventures Ltd.

Awards and Recognitions

Brand Finance’s Global 500 Brands: Maybank is the only Malaysian bank and one of two brands from Malaysia who qualified to be included in the prestigious Brand Finance’s Global 500 Brands list in January, 2019. Maybank achieved a brand valuation of US$4.2 billion, a 32% increase from 2018 valuation of $3.16 billion.

The Best Malaysian Organization 2018. Maybank was recognized as the 2018 ‘Best Malaysian Organisation’ by Talent Corporation Malaysia Berhad (TalentCorp) through its Life At Work Awards 2018 programme.

The Most Valuable Bank Brand in Malaysia: Maybank has been recognized as the top bank brand in Malaysia for the four consecutive years i.e. 2014-2018 based on the 2018 Brand Finance Banking 500 Brand Value Report issued by global brand valuation and strategy consulting firm, Brand Finance.

See also

List of largest Malaysian banks
List of largest banks in Southeast Asia

References

External links

 Maybank Group corporate website

 
Banks of Malaysia
Companies listed on Bursa Malaysia
Government-owned companies of Malaysia
Malaysian brands
Banks established in 1960
Companies based in Kuala Lumpur
Companies based in Bonifacio Global City
1960 establishments in Malaya
Multinational companies headquartered in Malaysia
Online brokerages
Permodalan Nasional Berhad